Laldja Bendahmane (born January 8, 1995 in Béjaïa) is an Algerian volleyball player.

Club information
Current club :  RC Bejaia

References
 Player's Biography
 Team Composition

1995 births
Volleyball players from Béjaïa
Living people
Algerian women's volleyball players
21st-century Algerian women